Timothy McKay may refer to:

 Tim McKay (1947–2006), environmentalist
 Timothy A. McKay, astrophysicist